The 2021 FC Tulsa season is the franchise's 7th season in the USL Championship, the second-tier professional soccer league in the United States.  It is their second season since the club's rebranding from Tulsa Roughnecks FC  to FC Tulsa.

Club

Staff
 James Cannon – President
 Michael Nsien – Head Coach
 Donovan Ricketts – First Assistant and Goalkeeping Coach
 Nemanja Vuković – Assistant Coach
 Cyprian Hedrick – Assistant Coach
 Miguel Wickert – Strength and Conditioning Coach
 Johnathon Millwee – Head Athletic Trainer

Competitions

Preseason

USL Championship

Standings — Central Division

Match results

USL Championship Playoffs

References

Tulsa Roughnecks
FC Tulsa
FC Tulsa
FC Tulsa